Albrecht Theodorich Freiherr Besserer von Thalfingen (8 October 1787 – 1 February 1839) was a Bavarian General, Hofmarschall of Maximilian I Joseph of Bavaria, and Acting War Minister under Ludwig I of Bavaria from 1 November 1838 to 28 January 1839.

Besserer, a member of the Besserer von Thalfingen line, was born in Langenau and died in Munich. On 26 September 1819 he married Caroline Adelheid Walburga Josepha Wilhelmina Freiin von Verger (1789–1870). The couple had two children, Maximilian Joseph Aloys (born 1820) and Therese Sophia (born 1824).

References and notes 

1787 births
1839 deaths
People from Langenau
Bavarian Ministers of War
Bavarian generals
People from the Kingdom of Bavaria
Bavarian nobility
Barons of Germany
Knights of the Military Order of Max Joseph
Recipients of the Order of St. Vladimir, 4th class
Recipients of the Pour le Mérite (military class)
Württembergian nobility
Recipients of the Order of St. Anna, 2nd class
Recipients of the Order of Saint Stanislaus (Russian), 1st class
German military personnel of the Napoleonic Wars